James Atkins (born 1941)  is an American artist known for his paintings of Philadelphia. Mainly self-taught, Atkins attended art classes at Samuel S. Fleisher Art Memorial art school in South Philadelphia.

Atkins' work was included in the 2011 exhibition The Chemistry of Color: The Sorgenti Collection of Contemporary African-American Art at the Hudson River Museum. His work was also included in the 2015 exhibition We Speak: Black Artists in Philadelphia, 1920s–1970s at the Woodmere Art Museum.

His work is in the Pennsylvania Academy of the Fine Arts.

References

1941 births
Living people
Artists from Philadelphia
American male artists